Stowell may refer to:

People
 Stowell (surname)
 William Scott, 1st Baron Stowell (1745–1836), English judge, jurist

Places

United Kingdom
 Stowell, Gloucestershire, England
 Stowell, Somerset, Egland

United States
 Stowell, Texas

Other uses
 Stowells, a British wine merchant, now owned by Accolade Wines